The 2021 Liga 3 Lampung will be the sixth season of Liga 3 Lampung as a qualifying round for the national round of the 2021–22 Liga 3.

AD Sport were the defending champion.

Teams
There are 14 teams participated in the league this season.

Group stage

Group A

Group B

Group C

Group D

Knockout stage

Quarter final

Semi final

(AD Sport FC won 4–2 on penalty shoot-out.)

Final

References

Liga 3
Sport in Lampung